The Merced Sun-Star is a daily broadsheet newspaper printed in Merced, California, in the United States. It has an estimated circulation of 20,000 copies.  The newspaper is published every day except for Sundays.

History
The Merced Sun-Star evolved from the San Joaquin Valley Argus, a weekly newspaper based in the nearby city of Snelling which began publishing the paper in 1869. The Argus merged with the Merced Journal in 1890 to become the Merced County Sun. In 1925 another consolidation created the Merced Sun-Star. In 1941, the Sun-Star was acquired by Dean Lesher. In 1995, Lesher's heirs sold the Sun-Star and the Madera Tribune to US Media, later renamed Pacific-Sierra Publishing. The newspaper was acquired by The McClatchy Company in 2004. Currently, the Sun-Star has more than 120 employees that prepare both a print newspaper and an online version.

Ownership
The Merced Sun-Star is owned by The McClatchy Company, which purchased it in 2004 along with five non-dailes in Atwater, Chowchilla, Livingston, Los Banos, and Oakhurst.

The paper is the county's only daily newspaper, although it is not the county's only newspaper. Merced County is also served by the Merced County Times, a weekly paper published each Thursday by Mid-Valley Publications.

Awards
The newspaper has become known for its investigative journalism. A series of articles exposing wrongdoing by the local district attorney ended in the DA's resignation and garnered the newspaper a national Associated Press Managing Editors Association public service award. The stories also won a California First Amendment Coalition Beacon Award, among other distinctions.
The newspaper won its second APME award (this one in the First Amendment category) in 2009 after it exposed a series of racist emails sent by an Atwater city councilman.

Online newspaper
The Sun-Star also has an online edition offering the latest news, sports, weather and information affecting Merced and Mariposa counties.

Weekly newspapers
The Merced Sun-Star also publishes the:
Atwater Signal
Chowchilla News
Livingston Chronicle

References

External links

Official  Merced Sun-Star website
official Merced Sun-Star mobile website

Daily newspapers published in California
Merced, California
Mass media in Merced County, California
McClatchy publications
Publications established in 1869
1869 establishments in California
Companies based in Merced County, California